Future Soldier 2030 Initiative was a US Army program that was launched in 2009 with the mission to research and develop future soldiers' equipments, weapons and body armors. The program investigates various futuristic technologies, including mind boosting drugs, powered exoskeletons and artificially intelligent assistants.

Cancellation
In late 2015, the Future soldier initiative was largely cancelled and shelved by its backers.

See also
 Future Soldier
 Futures studies
 Soldier 2025
 Supersoldier

References

Military robotics
Body armor
Prosthetics
 
Future soldier programs